Zebedee Kahangwa-Masereka (also Masereka Kahangwa) was an Anglican bishop in Uganda: he was Bishop of South Rwenzori from 1984 to 2003.

References

Anglican bishops of South Rwenzori
Uganda Christian University alumni
21st-century Anglican bishops in Uganda
20th-century Anglican bishops in Uganda